Badie may refer to:

 Badié, a village in the Bagassi Department of Balé Province in southern Burkina Faso
 Mohamed Badie, eighth General Guide (chairman) of the Egyptian Muslim Brotherhood
 Tyler Badie (born 1999), American football player